The women's 100 metres hurdles event at the 1999 Summer Universiade was held at the Estadio Son Moix in Palma de Mallorca, Spain on 10 and 11 July.

Medalists

Results

Heats
Wind:Heat 1: -2.3 m/s, Heat 2: -0.7 m/s, Heat 3: -1.4 m/s, Heat 4: -0.2 m/s

Semifinals
Wind:Heat 1: -1.4 m/s, Heat 2: -3.1 m/s

Final
Wind: -2.8 m/s

References

Athletics at the 1999 Summer Universiade
1999 in women's athletics
1999